Abdan (also Romanized as Ābdān; also known as Abdoon, Ābdūn, and Au Dan) is a city in Abdan District of Deyr County, Bushehr province, Iran. At the 2006 census, its population was 6,058 in 1,224 households. The following census in 2011 counted 6,211 people in 1,477 households. The latest census in 2016 showed a population of 6,827 people in 1,819 households.

References 

Cities in Bushehr Province
Populated places in Deyr County